is one of seven wards of Hamamatsu, Shizuoka, Japan, located in the central part of the city. It encompasses the site of Hamamatsu Castle and Hamamatsu Station, the central business district and a number of high density residential areas. Although its area is the smallest of the seven wards of Hamamatsu, it has the largest population. It is bordered by Higashi-ku, Kita-ku, Minami-ku, and Nishi-ku.

Naka-ku was created on April 1, 2007 when Hamamatsu became a city designated by government ordinance (a "designated city").

Education

Seien Girls' High School is located in the area.

International schools:
 Escola Brasil (former Escola Brasileira de Hamamatsu) - Brazilian school

Economy

Corporate headquarters
 Hamamatsu Photonics, a global manufacturer of optoelectronic components and systems
 Enkei Corporation, a motorcycle and passenger car wheel manufacturer

References

Wards of Hamamatsu